József Sándor (born 6 August 1892, date of death unknown) was a Hungarian wrestler. He competed in the lightweight event at the 1912 Summer Olympics.

References

External links
 

1892 births
Year of death missing
Wrestlers at the 1912 Summer Olympics
Hungarian male sport wrestlers
People from Jászárokszállás
Olympic wrestlers of Hungary
Sportspeople from Jász-Nagykun-Szolnok County